The Junkers J 3 was an all-metal single-seat experimental fighter aircraft.

Design and development 
A major drawback of the previous J 1 and J 2 designs was the weight of their overall construction, which consisted of heavy iron sheets and pipes.  The Inspektion der Fliegertruppen (Idflieg) saw all-metal construction as only useful for ground attack and observation aircraft, being too heavy for use in fighters.  In April 1916, in an attempt to prove Idflieg wrong, Hugo Junkers commissioned his head engineer Otto Mader in Dessau to develop a small, single-seat experimental aircraft of all-metal construction that could meet the climbing performance and maneuverability requirements of fighter aircraft.  Junkers suggested the use of duralumin, produced since 1909 at Dürener Metallwerke AG, which had been available in sufficient quantities for some time and promised a weight reduction of 60% compared to a conventional iron construction.

Mader envisaged two variants of the J 3; the J 3-I single-seat fighter, and the J 3-II two-seat attack aircraft.  A special feature of the construction was the use of corrugated sheets to compensate for the lower strength of the duralumin sheets.  The underlying tube construction was made of duralumin, with steel at critical construction points.  The aircraft was powered by a Oberursel U.III rotary engine, which was lighter than the Mercedes D.III that powered the J 2.  Also new in the design of the J 3 was the three-section wing, consisting of a center section integrated into the fuselage and a pair of outer sections.  The outer sections were attached to the center section using ball screws, which were a feature of later, allowing interchangeability of the outer wings.  The J 3 was built using rivets, as welding was found to be not easily applicable when using light metals.

The development and construction of the prototype took place without any order from IdFlieg and was operated entirely at Junkers' own expense.  In the run-up to the actual J 3 prototype construction, an airfoil made of duralumin was first produced and subjected to extensive load tests.  By using duralumin instead of iron, the weight of the wing could be reduced by a third.  Since the welding process used in the J 1 and J 2 was to be replaced by riveted joints in the J 3, extensive experiments were carried out in the workshop on riveting processes in advance of the actual prototype construction.

Construction of the prototype J 3-I began in the summer of 1916.  By autumn 1916, the entire tubular frame and the corrugated iron cladding of the wings had already been completed.  However, lack of funds and the looming IdFlieg order for the Junkers J 4 forced Hugo Junkers to stop work on the half-finished J 3 in October 1916.  Mader and his engineers devoted themselves to the construction of the Junkers J 4 from November 1916 onwards.  Duralumin was also used in the construction of the J 4, which later became the first all-metal aircraft of lightweight construction, instead of the J 3.

Legacy 
Although the Junkers J 3 was not completed, it laid the decisive foundations for future light aircraft construction.  The use of riveting in aircraft and fixture construction, and the basic design criteria for light metal aircraft resulted from the development of the J 3.  Numerous design elements of the J 3, such as ball screw connections and corrugated sheet metal, remained defining features of Junkers aircraft from the 1920s up to the Junkers Ju 52.

Variants 
J 3-I
Single-seat fighter.  Prototype abandoned midway through construction.

J 3-II
Two-seat ground attack aircraft.  None built.

Survivors 
The half-finished Junkers J 3 was stored in Dessau with the J 1 and several J 2s.  In the mid-1920s, these aircraft were brought to an exhibition at the newly emerging Junkers Lehrschau to document the early phase of all-metal aircraft construction.  Some sources report that the J 3 was destroyed in a bombing raid, while others report that the Americans removed the exhibition before Dessau was evacuated.  Nevertheless, all traces of the J 3 prototype were lost towards the end of the Second World War.

Specifications (J 3-I, as designed)

See also

References 

1910s German fighter aircraft
Junkers aircraft
Single-engine aircraft
1910s German attack aircraft